Gilva Dashtan (also Romanized as Gīlvā Dashtān and Gīlovā Dashtān; also known as Gīlovā and Gīlvā) is a village in Kenar Sar Rural District, Kuchesfahan District, Rasht County, Gilan Province, Iran. At the 2006 census, its population was 1,990, in 600 families.

References 

Populated places in Rasht County